Simon Cox (born 12 May 1970) is a British lightweight rower. He won a gold medal at the 1994 World Rowing Championships in Indianapolis with the lightweight men's eight.

References

1970 births
Living people
British male rowers
World Rowing Championships medalists for Great Britain